The Smart Financial Centre, is a concert hall located off U.S. Highway 59 in Sugar Land, Texas,  southwest of Houston. It is owned by the City of Sugar Land and is the only indoor live performance venue of its kind in the Greater Houston area.

History
Groundbreaking began on the theater on December 9, 2014. In February 2015, naming rights were granted to Smart Financial Credit Union by the Sugar Land City Council. The theater opened on January 14, 2017 with back to back Jerry Seinfeld shows.

Events
The theater is designed to host a wide range of performances.

References

Music venues in Texas
Concert halls in Texas
2017 establishments in Texas